Yundola Cove is a 1.34 km wide cove indenting for 670 m the north coast of Robert Island in the South Shetland Islands, Antarctica west of Lavrenov Point.  The feature is named after Yundola Saddle between Rila Mountain and the Rhodope Mountains in southern Bulgaria.

Location

Map
 L.L. Ivanov. Antarctica: Livingston Island and Greenwich, Robert, Snow and Smith Islands. Scale 1:120000 topographic map.  Troyan: Manfred Wörner Foundation, 2009.

References
 Yundola Cove. SCAR Composite Antarctic Gazetteer
 Bulgarian Antarctic Gazetteer. Antarctic Place-names Commission. (details in Bulgarian, basic data in English)

External links
 Yundola Cove. Copernix satellite image

Coves of Robert Island
Bulgaria and the Antarctic